William Sidney Cooper (1854–1927) was a British landscape artist, best known for his paintings of the countryside around Herne Bay in Kent.

Life and work
William trained with his Great-Uncle Thomas Sidney Cooper at his School of Art in Canterbury. William became a successful artist exhibiting at the Royal Academy, the Royal Society of British Artists (Suffolk Street galleries, London) and the Royal Watercolour Society.
 
Cooper married in 1882, and in 1890 moved to Herne Bay in Kent where he remained for the rest of his life. As well as painting professionally, he was a keen golfer and liked to play Tennis and Bowls. He was also a musician and took part in local musical events. He built many houses in and around Canterbury, the best known being, Alcroft Grange (where the dreaded Podgers lived for a while)

His work
Much of Cooper's work reflects the countryside around Herne Bay and often contain cattle (which were his speciality) and sheep as in his Great Uncle's work. He died in 1927 and is buried in the churchyard at Eddington, Kent.

References

External links

Paintings by W S Cooper (Artnet)
Paintings by W S Cooper (Bourne Gallery)
Maytime on the Thames (1888, oil on canvas - Christie's)
Dedham Bridge (1890, oil on canvas - Christie's)
Artwork by William Sidney Cooper
Paintings by William S. Cooper

19th-century English painters
English male painters
20th-century English painters
English watercolourists
English landscape painters
People from Herne Bay, Kent
1854 births
1927 deaths
20th-century English male artists
19th-century English male artists